The Archdiocese of Pamplona y Tudela is an archdiocese located in the cities of Pamplona and Tudela in Spain.

Timeline
 5th century: Established as Diocese of Pamplona 
 9th century: northern boundary established by Charles's Cross
 5 September 1851: Renamed as Diocese of Pamplona – Tudela
 17 July 1889: Renamed as Diocese of Pamplona 
 2 September 1955: Renamed as Diocese of Pamplona – Tudela
 11 August 1956: Promoted as Metropolitan Archdiocese of Pamplona – Tudela
 11 August 1984: Renamed as Metropolitan Archdiocese of Pamplona y Tudela

Leadership

Bishops of Pamplona
 Firminus (late 3rd century)
 Liliolus (before 589, after 592)
 John I (fl. 610)
 Atilanus (fl. 683)
 Marcianus (fl. 693)
 Opilanus (fl. 829)
 Wiliesind (848–860)

In 850, in the face of a Muslim invasion, the seat of the bishop was transferred to Leire.

Bishops of Pamplona at Leire
 Jimeno I (876–914)
 Basilio (918–922)
 Galindo (922–928)
 Valentín (928–947)
 Blasco I (971–972)
 Bibas (979–???)
 Julian (983–985)
 Sisebut (988–997)
 Jimeno II (1000–1005)
 Sancho I el Mayor (1015–1024)

In 1023, the see was reestablished in Pamplona.

Bishops of Pamplona
 Sancho II el Menor (1025–1051)
 John II (1052–1068)
 Blasco II (1068–1078/79)
 García Ramírez (1078/79–1082)
 Sancha of Aragon (1082–1083), regent
 Pedro de Roda (1083–1115)
 William I (Guillermo) (1122)
 Sancho de Larrosa (1122–1142)
 Lope de Artajona (1143–1159)
 Sancho III (1160–1164)
 Pedro Compostelano (1162–1164)
 Raymond (1163)
 Bibiano (1165–1166)
 Peter of Paris (1167–1193)
 Martín de Tafalla (1193–1194), elected
 García Ferrández (1194–1205)
 Juan de Tarazona (1205–1211)
 Espárago de la Barca (1212–1215)
 William of Saintonge (1215–1219)
 Remiro de Navarra (1220–1229)
 Pedro Ramírez de Pedrola (1230–1238)

Between 1238 and 1242, the throne was vacant while the chapter was divided between supporters of Lope García and of the archdeacon Guillermo de Oriz.

 Pedro Jiménez de Gazólaz (1242–1266)
 Armingot (1268–1277)
 Miguel Sánchez de Uncastillo (1277–1286)
 Miguel Periz de Legaria (1288–1304)
 Arnaud de Poyanne (1310–1316)
 Guillaume Mechin (1316–1317)
 Raul Rossellet (1317)
 Michel Maucondiut (1317), elected
 Semén García de Asiáin (1317), elected
 Arnaud de Barbazan (1318–1355)
 Pierre de Monteruc (1355–1356)
 Miguel Sánchez de Asiáin (1356–1364)
 Bernard Folcaut (1364–1377)
 Martín de Zalba (1377–1390)

Martín resigned the see to become a cardinal in 1390, but he continued as apostolic administrator until 1403.

 Miguel de Zalba, cardinal (1404–1406), elected
 Martín de Eusa (1406–1407), vicar general
 Nicolás López de Roncesvalles (1407–1408), vicar
 García de Aibar (1408), vicar general
 Lancelot de Navarra (1408–1420), vicar general
 Sancho Sánchez de Oteiza (1420–1425)
 Martín de Peralta I (1426–1456)
 Martín de Peralta II (1457–1458)
 Basilios Bessarion, cardinal (1458–1462), apostolic administrator
 Nicolás de Echávarri (1462–1469)
 Alfonso Carrillo (1473–1491)
 César Borja, cardinal (1491–1492), transferred to the archdiocese of Valencia
Antonio Pallavicino Gentili, cardinal (1492–1507), apostolic administrator
Fazio Giovanni Santori, cardinal (1507–1510), apostolic administrator
Amaneu de Labrit, cardinal (1510–1512), apostolic administrator (first time)
Giovanni Ruffo de Theodoli (1512–1517), apostolic administrator
Amaneu de Labrit (1517–1520), apostolic administrator (second time)
Alessandro Cesarini, cardinal (1520–1538), apostolic administrator, resigned
 Juan Remmia (1538–1539)
 Pedro Pacheco Ladrón de Guevara, cardinal (1539–1545), transferred to the diocese of Jaén
 Antonio de Fonseca (1545–1550), resigned
 Álvaro Moscoso (1550–1561), transferred to the diocese of  Zamora
 Diego Ramírez Sedeño de Fuenleal (1561–1573)
 Antonio Manrique Valencia (1575–1577)
 Pedro de Lafuente (1578–1587)
 Bernardo de Sandoval y Rojas (1588–1596), transferred to the diocese of Jaén
 Antonio Zapata y Cisneros (1596–1600), transferred to the archdiocese of Burgos
 Mateo de Burgos (1600–1606), transferred to the diocese of Sigüenza
 Antonio Venegas y Figueroa (1606–1612), transferred to the diocese of Sigüenza
 Prudencio de Sandoval (1612–1620)
 Francisco Hurtado de Mendoza y Ribera (1621–1622), transferred to the diocese of Málaga
 Cristóbal de Lobera y Torres (1623–1625), transferred to the diocese of Córdoba
 José González Díez (1625–1627), transferred to the archdiocese of Santiago de Compostela
 Pedro Fernández Zorrilla (1627–1637)
 Juan Queipo de Llano y Flórez (1639–1647), transferred to the diocese of Jaén
 Francisco Diego Alarcón y Covarrubias (1648–1657), transferred to the diocese of Córdoba
 Diego de Tejada y la Guardia (1658–1663)
 Andrés Girón (1664–1670)
 Pedro Roche (1670–1683)
 Juan Grande Santos de San Pedro (1683–1692)
 Toribio de Mier (1693–1698)
 Juan Íñiguez Arnedo (1700–1710)
 Pedro Aguado (1713–1716)
 Juan Camargo Angulo (1716–1725)
 Andrés Murillo Velarde (1725–1728)
 Melchor Angel Gutiérrez Vallejo (1729–1734)
 Francisco Ignacio Añoa y Busto (1735–1742), transferred to the archdiocese of Zaragoza
 Gaspar Miranda Argáiz (1742–1767)
 Juan Lorenzo Irigoyen Dutari (1768–1778)
 Agustín de Lezo Palomeque (1779–1783), transferred to the archdiocese of Zaragoza
 Esteban Antonio Aguado Rojas (1785–1795)
 Lorenzo Igual de Soria (1795–1803), transferred to the diocese of Plasencia
 Veremundo Anselmo Arias Teixeiro (1804–1814), transferred to the archdiocese of Valencia
 Joaquín Javier Uriz Lasaga (1815–1829)
 Severo Leonardo Andriani Escofet (1829–1861)
 Pedro Cirilo Uriz Labayru (1861–1870)
 José Oliver y Hurtado (1875–1886)
 Antonio Ruiz–Cabal y Rodríguez (1886–1899)
 José López Mendoza y García (1899–1923)
 Mateo Múgica y Urrestarazu (1923–1928), transferred to the diocese of Vitoria
 Tomás Muñiz Pablos (1928–1935), transferred to the archdiocese of Santiago de Compostela
 Marcelino Olaechea Loizaga (1935–1946), transferred to the archdiocese of Valencia
 Enrique Delgado y Gómez (1946–1955), became also bishop of Tudela

Bishops of Pamplona and Tudela
 Enrique Delgado y Gómez (1955–1956), became archbishop

Archbishops of Pamplona and Tudela
 Enrique Delgado y Gómez (1956–1968)
 Arturo Tabera Araoz, cardinal (1968–1971)
 José Méndez Asensio (1971–1978), transferred to the archdiocese of Granada
 José María Cirarda Lachiondo (1978–1993)
 Fernando Sebastián Aguilar (1993–2007)
 Francisco Pérez González (2007–....)

Auxiliary bishops
 Ángel Riesco Carbajo (1958–1969) 
 José María Larrauri Lafuente (1970–1979), transferred to the diocese of Vitoria
 Juan Antonio Aznárez Cobo (2012–....)

Suffragan dioceses
 Calahorra y La Calzada-Logroño
 Jaca
 San Sebastián

See also
Roman Catholicism in Spain

References

Sources
 GCatholic.org
 Catholic Hierarchy
 Diocese website

Roman Catholic dioceses in Spain
Dioceses established in the 5th century
Christian organizations established in 1984
Roman Catholic dioceses and prelatures established in the 20th century
Pamplona
1984 establishments in Spain